MassCoMedia, located in Noida, Uttar Pradesh, is a college in India that offer courses in journalism, advertising, animation, public relations, event management, TV production/direction and broadcast journalism.

The college provides programs in Mass communication, TV Journalism, Broadcast Journalism, Radio Jockey, Advertising, Public Relations and Events management.

It houses channel ready TV-studios, a radio studio and an animation facility, along with Non- Linear Editing suites.

The institute has two industry-standard TV studios, a radio studio, a photography studio and a number of e-classrooms, where lessons in media related activities are imparted to students.

The residential campus for students studying at MassCoMedia (Noida Division) is located at Greater Noida. The residential campus also has studios equipped to handle filming and sound recording work for TV and films. The minimum eligibility for students aspiring to join MassCoMedia is 10+2 in any stream or its equivalent. The admission process entails an entrance test and an interview. The admission process starts in February and goes up to August of every year.

Founder is Divesh Nath, who is also the Managing editor and Publishing Director of Delhi Press Magazines, estd 1938. Delhi Press magazines publish 32 magazines in 9 languages in India.

In 2014 MassCoMedia was judged to be the 6th best institute for Journalism in India and the 4th best institute for Mass Communication education in the North India. The college now has 300+ on campus students.

Divesh Nath founded Masscomedia, in 2007, which is a mass communications company imparting media education. It also produces programs for various TV channels.

Information
 Students receive practical experience of shooting movies and news documentaries. 
 There are extracurricular activities like rocks shows and parties, conferences and seminars are organized. 
 Students travel around India and make films and documentaries.

Management

Founder and Managing Director 
Devish Nath, 1985, Present (30 years) New Delhi Area, India: He is also the Managing editor and Publishing Director of Delhi Press Magazines. Established in 1938,  Delhi Press magazines publish 32 magazines in 9 languages in India, including English at present.

Owner CEO 
Pramod Engineering, January 2004, Present (11 years 1 month): Manufacturing high speed bindery and web printing machines for assorted printing industry requirements.

Founder and Collector 
The Lexicon Art, January 2006, Present (9 years 1 month): It comprises best collection from the Indian contemporary art online, from Hussains to new artists. Thousands of art work to choose, click through and purchase.

Diploma Programs 
 Master Program in TV Production, Direction & Broadcast Journalism (MTV)
 Master/Diploma in Advertising, Public Relations & Brand Management (MAPR)
 Diploma in Television Production(DTV)
 Diploma in TV Serials and Film-Making 
 Diploma in Advertising, Public Relations & Brand Management(DAPR)

External links
MassCoMedia website
Alternative MassCoMedia website
Students' TV website

Journalism schools in India
Universities and colleges in Noida
2007 establishments in Uttar Pradesh
Educational institutions established in 2007